Roseala is a monotypic moth genus of the family Hepialidae. The only described species is R. bourgognei which is endemic to Brazil.

References

External links
Hepialidae genera

Hepialidae
Endemic fauna of Brazil
Monotypic moth genera
Moths of South America
Taxa named by Pierre Viette
Exoporia genera